Eissportzentrum Westfalenhallen is an indoor sporting arena at the Strobelallee in Dortmund, Germany. It is primarily used for ice hockey and is the home arena of Eisadler Dortmund, and of the figure skating club ERC Westfalen. It was opened in 1952 and can accommodate 5,000 spectators, including 3,998 standing and 1,002 seats.

See also
List of indoor arenas in Germany

References

External links

Westfalenhallen.de

Indoor arenas in Germany
Buildings and structures in Dortmund
Indoor ice hockey venues in Germany
Sports venues in North Rhine-Westphalia
Sports venues completed in 1952
1952 establishments in West Germany